Lab Sefid, also rendered as Lop Sefid, may refer to:
 Lab Sefid-e Olya
 Lab Sefid-e Sofla